La Mujer sin Alma ("The Soulless Woman") is a Mexican movie of 1944, directed by Fernando de Fuentes and starring by María Félix.

Plot 
The movie is a version of an Alphonse Daudet novel. Teresa (Félix) is a young and evil woman who uses her beauty to seduce rich men and climb socially. The movie gave Félix her fame of the "Man Eater" and the vamp of the Golden Era of Mexican Cinema.

External links 

1940s Spanish-language films
Mexican black-and-white films
1944 drama films
1944 films
Films based on works by Alphonse Daudet
Mexican drama films
1940s Mexican films